Robert Earl Taylor (born April 29, 1953) is an American former sprinter.

At the 1975 Pan American Games, Taylor was a member of gold medal winning 4 × 400 m relay team and won the AAU championships in 400 m in 1977.

Taylor came third in the 400 meters at the 1977 IAAF Athletics World Cup in Düsseldorf whilst representing the US. By virtue of this, he was part of a controversy as the race was re-run the day after the first run because Alberto Juantorena (of Cuba representing the Americas) lodged a successful protest that he had not been able to hear the starter's gun in the first race.

Taylor was ranked as one of the best 400 m runners in 1976 and 1977.

References

1953 births
Living people
American male sprinters
Athletes (track and field) at the 1975 Pan American Games
Pan American Games gold medalists for the United States
Pan American Games medalists in athletics (track and field)
Medalists at the 1975 Pan American Games